The squash competition at the 2002 Commonwealth Games took place in Manchester, England from 25 July – 4 August 2002. There were no bronze medal play off matches because both losing semi-finalists were awarded a bronze medal.

Medallists

Results

Men's singles (26-31 July)

Women's singles (27-31 July)

Men's doubles (31 July-4 Aug)

Women's doubles (31 July-4 Aug)

Mixed doubles (31 July-4 Aug)

References

2002 Commonwealth Games events
2002